[1] Although issued in three classes (Gold, Silver and Bronze) all three medals carry the same post-nominal letters.

References 

Post
Post-nominal letters
Trinidad